Khancoban Dam is a major ungated earthfill embankment dam with a controlled spillway across the Swampy Plain River in the Snowy Mountains region of New South Wales, Australia. The dam's main purpose is for the generation of hydro-power and is one of the sixteen major dams that comprise the Snowy Mountains Scheme, a vast hydroelectricity and irrigation complex constructed in south-east Australia between 1949 and 1974 and now run by Snowy Hydro.

The impounded reservoir is called the Khancoban Reservoir.

Location and features
The dam was constructed by Kaiser Engineers and Construction Incorporation based on engineering plans developed under contract from the Snowy Mountains Hydroelectric Authority.

At 100% capacity the dam wall holds back  of water. The controlled spillway is capable of discharging .

Located immediately upstream of the Khancoban Reservoir is the Murray 2 Power Station, a  conventional hydroelectric power station. Water from the power plant is discharged into the reservoir, before passing over the spillway of Khancoban Dam, and down the Swampy Plain River.

See also

 Kosciuszko National Park
 List of dams and reservoirs in New South Wales
 Snowy Hydro Limited
 Snowy Mountains Scheme
 Snowy Scheme Museum

References

External links
 

Snowy Mountains Scheme
Embankment dams
Dams in New South Wales
Dams completed in 1965
Kosciuszko National Park
Dams in the Murray River basin
Earth-filled dams
Snowy Valleys Council